George Cecil Ives (1 October 1867 in Frankfurt, Germany – 4 June 1950 in Hampstead/Middlesex, Great Britain) was an English poet, writer, penal reformer and early homosexual law reform campaigner.

Life and career
Ives was the illegitimate son of Gordon Maynard Ives (1837–1907), an English army officer, and Jane Violet Tyler (1846–1936). He was brought up by his paternal grandmother, Emma Ives, with whom he lived between Bentworth in Hampshire and the South of France. Ives met his birth mother only twice and had a fraught relationship with his father.

Ives was educated at home and at Magdalene College, Cambridge, where he started to amass 45 volumes of scrapbooks (between 1892 and 1949). These scrapbooks consist of clippings on topics such as murders, punishments, freaks, theories of crime and punishment, transvestism, psychology of gender, homosexuality, cricket scores, and letters he wrote to newspapers. His interest in cricket led him to play a single first-class cricket match for the Marylebone Cricket Club in 1902.

Ives was a member of the Humanitarian League, a radical advocacy group, which operated between 1891 and 1919.

Ives met Oscar Wilde at the Authors' Club in London in 1892.  Ives was already working for the end of the “oppression” of homosexuals, what he called "the Cause." He hoped that Wilde would join "the Cause", but was disappointed. In 1893, Lord Alfred Douglas, with whom he had a brief affair, introduced Ives to several Oxford poets whom Ives also tried to recruit.

By 1897, Ives founded the Order of Chaeronea, a secret society for homosexuals which was named after the location of the battle where the Sacred Band of Thebes was finally annihilated in 338 BC. The society held occasional meetings in London and provided a venue for the Uranian poets and writers to meet each other and keep in touch. Members included Charles Kains Jackson, Samuel Elsworth Cottam, Montague Summers, and John Gambril Nicholson.

The same year, Ives visited Edward Carpenter at Millthorpe. This marked the beginning of their friendship.

In 1914, Ives, together with Edward Carpenter, Magnus Hirschfeld, Laurence Housman and others, founded the British Society for the Study of Sex Psychology. He also kept in touch with other progressive psychologists such as Havelock Ellis and Professor Cesare Lombroso. The topics addressed by the Society in lectures and publications included: the promotion of the scientific study of sex and a more rational attitude towards sexual conduct; problems and questions connected with sexual psychology (from medical, juridical, and sociological aspects), birth control, abortion, sterilisation, venereal diseases, and all aspects of prostitution. In 1931, the organisation became the British Sexological Society. Ives was the archivist for the Society, whose papers were purchased by the Harry Ransom Center at the University of Texas at Austin (at which point they left the UK).

Ives also visited prisons across Europe and specialised in the study of penal methods, particularly those of England. He lectured and published books on the topic. He died in 1950, aged 82, in London. He was cremated at Golders Green Crematorium and was buried in the village of Bentworth, Hampshire.

The Ives papers
At his death in 1950, George Ives left a large archive covering his life and work between 1874 and 1949. The papers were bought in 1977 by the Harry Ransom Research Center at the University of Texas at Austin.  They have been divided into four sections as follows:

I. Correspondence, 1874–1936
This section contains invitations and letters regarding Ives' writings and lectures on prison reform, sodomy, the British Society for the Study of Sex Psychology, and other topics. Ives' correspondents include Adolf Brand, Oscar Browning, Edward Carpenter, Havelock Ellis, Norman Gale, Augustus Hare, Ernest Jones, Cesare Lombroso, Charlotte Maria North, Reggie Turner and Edward Westermarck.

II. Works, 1897–1937
This section groups examples of Ives' published works, lectures, notes and samples of verse, both as typescripts and holographs. The topics represented include: prison reform, crime and punishment, historical views of sexuality, religion.

III. Diaries, 1886–1949
The bulk of the material consists of 122 volumes of diaries kept by Ives from the age of nineteen until about six months before his death at age eighty-two. Most of the diaries have daily entries for the period from 20 December 1886 to 16 November 1949. The view Ives provides in his diary of the life of an upper-middle class English homosexual from the end of the nineteenth century to the mid-twentieth century is of particular interest for understanding the homosexual movement in England during this time. The content varies from descriptive impressions of social events to detailed examinations of his friends and acquaintances, analyses of the treatment of criminals, and the workings of prisons. From volume thirteen on, Ives indexed his diaries, and he often used them when he was preparing for a lecture or other writings.

IV. Miscellaneous, 1888–1949
This section includes the rules and wax seal impressions for the Order of Chaeronea, along with a library catalogue for the British Society for the Study of Sex Psychology, and a scrapbook of reviews and loose clippings for three of Ives' books, Eros' Throne (1900), A History of Penal Methods (1914), and Obstacles to Human Progress (1939). There is also a galley proof of George Bernard Shaw's preface to English Prisons Today (1922), prior to alterations.

Raffles
He was the model for Raffles, the fictional Victorian gentleman thief, according to Andrew Lycett. Lycett says that the creator of Raffles, E. W. Hornung, "may not have understood this sexual side of Ives' character", but that Raffles "enjoys a remarkably intimate relationship with his sidekick Bunny Manders."

Order of Chaeronea 
In the autumn of 1893, George Ives set up a secret society to promote homosexuality. His diary entry for October stated that his time was, 'so full of plotting and planning'. The secret society was named the order of Chaeronea after the battle of the same name where the male lovers of the Theban Band were killed in 338 BC. The 'rules of purpose' stated that the order was, 'A theory of life', although its purpose was mostly political. Many of the members were gay men although some were lesbian women. 

The 'service of Initiation' for the Order of Chaeronea still survives and contains the 'Vow that shall make you one of our number' :                                                                 

That you will never vex or persecute lovers.                                                                                                                                                                                                           That all real love shall be to you as a sanctuary.                                                                                                                                                                                                     That all heart-love, legal and illegal, wise and unwise, happy and disastrous, shall yet be consecrate for that love's Holy Presence dwelt there.

Its unknown exactly how many people were a part of Ives's Order of Chaeronea as no membership lists survive and the members most likely referred to each other by initials if at all. However, at the Orders peak it most likely had perhaps two or three hundred members. Ives made sure that the order was kept secret and that it was kept vital, telling new members that, 'Thou art forbidden to mention who belongs to anybody outside it.' According to George Ives the order was not set up so that men could meet for sex, writing that sex 'is forbidden on duty.' He continued to say that, 'All flames are pure.' It is said that Oscar Wilde was an early recruit of the Order of Chaeronea, 'Oscar Wilde's influence will be considerable, I think,' Ives wrote in his diary on the 26th October.

Bibliography

Verses 
 Book of Chains (1897)
 Eros' Throne (1900)

Non-fiction 
 Penal Methods in the Middle Ages (1910)
 The Treatment of Crime (1912)
 A History of Penal Methods: Criminals, Witches, Lunatics (1914)
 The Sexes, Structure, & "Extra-organic" Habits of certain Animals (1918)
 The Continued Extension of the Criminal Law (1922)
 English Prisons Today (Prefaced by G.B. Shaw; 1922)
 Graeco-Roman View of Youth (1926)
 Obstacles to Human Progress (1939)
 The Plight of the Adolescent

Fiction 
 The Missing Baronet (1914)

Sources
George Cecil Ives, Papers: 1874–1949  at the Harry Ransom Center at the University of Texas at Austin
The Pink Plaque Guide to London, Michael Elliman and Frederick Roll, Gay Men's Press, 1986, . p108

References

See also
 London and the Culture of Homosexuality 1885–1914, Matt Cook, Cambridge University Press, 2003,  | 
Elysium Books catalog with description of Ives' notebooks
 Man Bites Man Ives Scrapebooks edited by Paul Sieveking, Jay Landesman Publishers, 1981.
 Oxford Dictionary of National Biography

1867 births
1950 deaths
Alumni of Magdalene College, Cambridge
English cricketers
Gay sportsmen
British gay writers
Uranians
LGBT cricketers
English LGBT poets
English LGBT sportspeople
Marylebone Cricket Club cricketers
Penologists
People from Bentworth
Prison reformers
English LGBT rights activists